Vinicius Balieiro Lourenço de Carvalho (born 28 May 1999), known as Vinicius Balieiro, is a Brazilian footballer who plays for Santos. Mainly a defensive midfielder, he can also play as a right back.

Club career

Paulista
Born in Campinas, São Paulo, Balieiro represented Paulista's under-15s in the 2014 season, but had to leave the club at the end of the season. He returned one year later and featured in the 2017 edition of the Copa São Paulo de Futebol Júnior.

Balieiro made his senior debut on 12 February 2017, coming on as a second-half substitute in a 2–0 away loss against Monte Azul. He appeared in two further matches for the main squad before leaving.

Santos
In May 2017, Baileiro moved to Santos, being assigned to the under-20 squad. He was assigned to the B-team ahead of the 2019 campaign, training regularly with the first team. On 21 July 2020, he was registered for the year's Campeonato Paulista.

Balieiro made his first team – and Série A – debut for Santos on 14 November 2020, starting in a 2–0 home win against Internacional. He made his Copa Libertadores debut ten days later, replacing goalscorer Yeferson Soteldo in a 2–1 away success over LDU Quito.

Balieiro scored his first professional goal on 9 March 2021, netting the opener in a 2–1 home win against Deportivo Lara. On 11 October, he renewed his contract until December 2025.

Personal life
Balieiro is physically likened to former Brazil national team midfielder Paulinho, being known as Paulinho during his stint at Paulista. His younger brother Thiago is also a footballer; a central defender, he also plays for Santos.

Career statistics

References

External links

1999 births
Living people
Sportspeople from Campinas
Brazilian footballers
Association football midfielders
Campeonato Brasileiro Série A players
Paulista Futebol Clube players
Santos FC players